Tyson Smith may refer to:
Tyson Smith (American football), American football linebacker
Tyson Smith, wrestler performing under the name Kenny Omega

See also
Herbert Tyson Smith English sculptor
Stuart Tyson Smith, Egyptologist